This is a list of active rebel groups that control territory around the world whose domains may be subnational, transnational, or international. A "rebel group" is defined here as a polity that uses armed conflict in opposition to established government (or governments) for reasons such as to seek political change or to establish, maintain, or to gain independence. Groups that "control territory" are defined as any group that hold any populated or inhabited town, city, village, or defined area that is under the direct administration or military control of the group. Such control may be contested and might be temporary or fluctuating, especially under the circumstance of conflict.

It does not include the governments of stable breakaway states or other states with limited recognition.

List of groups that control territory

See also 
 List of active rebel groups
 List of guerrilla movements
 List of designated terrorist groups
 List of ongoing armed conflicts
 Lists of active separatist movements
 Violent non-state actor
 Compare to sovereign state

References 

Rebel groups by country